Farmer House is a historic home located near Deatonville, Amelia County, Virginia. It was built about 1820, and is a two-story, five-bay frame dwelling with brick end chimneys.  It has a one-bay pedimented front porch.  Also on the property are two additional contributing buildings.

It was added to the National Register of Historic Places in 1978.

References

Houses on the National Register of Historic Places in Virginia
Houses completed in 1820
Houses in Amelia County, Virginia
National Register of Historic Places in Amelia County, Virginia